Mitchell Thomas William Dunshea (born 18 November 1995) is a New Zealand Rugby Union player who currently plays as a lock or loose forward for  in New Zealand's domestic Mitre 10 Cup and the  in the international Super Rugby competition.

Early career

Born in Hamilton, Dunshea moved south to New Zealand's South Island at a young age and attended Lincoln High School just outside Christchurch.   He moved on to Lincoln University after graduating from high school where he began studying Sports and Recreation and turned out for their rugby side in the Canterbury local leagues.   In 2015, he helped them to win their first Division 1 title since 1981.   He also won the national colts title with Canterbury's under-20 side in 2014.

Senior career

A foot injury meant that he played no part in Canterbury's 2016 Mitre 10 Cup campaign which saw them finish as champions for the 8th time in 9 years.

Super Rugby

An excellent debut season at provincial level for Canterbury saw him make the Crusaders wider training group for the 2016 Super Rugby season.   A foot injury ruled him out for the entire year, but nonetheless he was promoted to the senior squad for 2017.

International

Dunshea was a member of the New Zealand Under-20 side which won the 2015 World Rugby Under 20 Championship in Italy, playing 4 times.

Career honours

New Zealand Under-20

World Rugby Under 20 Championship – 2015

Canterbury'

National Provincial Championship – 2015

References

External links
 

1995 births
Living people
New Zealand rugby union players
Rugby union locks
Rugby union flankers
Canterbury rugby union players
Rugby union players from Hamilton, New Zealand
People educated at Lincoln High School, New Zealand
Lincoln University (New Zealand) alumni
Crusaders (rugby union) players